St. Charles Parish Hospital is a hospital in Luling, Louisiana.

History
The hospital opened in 1959 as a public hospital managed by the St. Charles Hospital Service District.

In 2014, the hospital became part of the Ochsner Health System, a private not-for-profit hospital system. Ochsner manages the hospital, but the St. Charles Hospital Service District maintained ownership of the facility.

Facilities
The 260,000 square-foot hospital features 59-acute care beds. The facility is completely accredited by the Joint Commission of Health Care Organizations (JCAHO).

See also
List of hospitals in Louisiana

References

External links
St. Charles Parish Hospital Official Site

Hospitals in Louisiana
Buildings and structures in St. Charles Parish, Louisiana
Hospital buildings completed in 1959